The Indomalayan realm is one of the eight biogeographic realms. It extends across most of South and Southeast Asia and into the southern parts of East Asia.

Also called the Oriental realm by biogeographers, Indomalaya spreads all over the Indian subcontinent and Southeast Asia to lowland southern China, and through Indonesia as far as Sumatra, Java, Bali, and Borneo, east of which lies the Wallace line, the realm boundary named after Alfred Russel Wallace which separates Indomalaya from Australasia. Indomalaya also includes the Philippines, lowland Taiwan, and Japan's Ryukyu Islands.

Most of Indomalaya was originally covered by forest, and includes tropical and subtropical moist broadleaf forests, with tropical and subtropical dry broadleaf forests predominant in much of India and parts of Southeast Asia. The tropical forests of Indomalaya are highly variable and diverse, with economically important trees, especially in the families Dipterocarpaceae and Fabaceae.

Major ecological regions 

The World Wildlife Fund (WWF) divides Indomalayan realm into three bio-regions, which it defines as "geographic clusters of eco-regions that may span several habitat types, but have strong biogeographic affinities, particularly at taxonomic levels higher than the species level (genus, family)".

Indian subcontinent 
The Indian subcontinent bioregion covers most of India, Bangladesh, Nepal, Bhutan, and Sri Lanka and eastern parts of Pakistan. The Hindu Kush, Karakoram, Himalaya, and Patkai ranges bound the bioregion on the northwest, north, and northeast; these ranges were formed by the collision of the northward-drifting Indian subcontinent with Asia beginning 45 million years ago. The Hindu Kush, Karakoram, and Himalaya are a major biogeographic boundary between the subtropical and tropical flora and fauna of the Indian subcontinent and the temperate-climate Palearctic realm.

Indochina 
The Indochina bioregion includes most of mainland Southeast Asia, including Myanmar, Thailand, Laos, Vietnam, and Cambodia, as well as the subtropical forests of southern China.

Sunda Shelf and the Philippines 

Malesia is a botanical province which straddles the boundary between Indomalaya and Australasia. It includes the Malay Peninsula and the western Indonesian islands (known as Sundaland), the Philippines, the eastern Indonesian islands, and New Guinea. While the Malesia has much in common botanically, the portions east and west of the Wallace Line differ greatly in land animal species; Sundaland shares its fauna with mainland Asia, while terrestrial fauna on the islands east of the Wallace line are derived at least in part from species of Australian origin, such as marsupial mammals and ratite birds.

History 
The flora of Indomalaya blends elements from the ancient supercontinents of Laurasia and Gondwana. Gondwanian elements were first introduced by India, which detached from Gondwana approximately 90 MYA, carrying its Gondwana-derived flora and fauna northward, which included cichlid fish and the plant families Crypteroniaceae and possibly Dipterocarpaceae. India collided with Asia 30-45 MYA, and exchanged species. Later, as Australia-New Guinea drifted north, the collision of the Australian and Asian plates pushed up the islands of Wallacea, which were separated from one another by narrow straits, allowing a botanic exchange between Indomalaya and Australasia. Asian rainforest flora, including the dipterocarps, island-hopped across Wallacea to New Guinea, and several Gondwanian plant families, including podocarps and araucarias, moved westward from Australia-New Guinea into western Malesia and Southeast Asia.

Flora 
The subfamily Dipterocarpoideae comprises characteristic tree species in Indomalaya's moist and seasonally dry forests, with the greatest species diversity in the moist forests of Borneo. Teak (Tectona) is characteristic of the seasonally dry forests of the Indomalaya, from India through Indochina, Malaysia, and the Philippines. Tropical pitcher plants (Nepenthes) are also characteristic of Indomalaya, and the greatest diversity of species is in Sumatra, Borneo, and the Philippines.

The tropical forests of Indomalaya and Australasia share many lineages of plants, which have managed over millions of years to disperse across the straits and islands between Sundaland and New Guinea. The two floras evolved in long isolation, and the fossil record suggests that Asian species dispersed to Australasia starting 33 million years ago as Australasia moved northwards, and dispersal increased 12 million years ago as the two continents approached their present positions. The exchange was asymmetric, with more Indomalayan species spreading to Australasia than Australasian species to Indomalaya.

Fauna 
Two orders of mammals, the colugos (Dermoptera) and treeshrews (Scandentia), are endemic to the realm, as are families Craseonycteridae (Kitti's hog-nosed bat), Diatomyidae, Platacanthomyidae, Tarsiidae (tarsiers) and Hylobatidae (gibbons). Large mammals characteristic of Indomalaya include the leopard, tigers, water buffalos, Asian elephant, Indian rhinoceros, Javan rhinoceros, Malayan tapir, orangutans, and gibbons.

Indomalaya has three endemic bird families, the Irenidae (fairy bluebirds), Megalaimidae and Rhabdornithidae (Philippine creepers). Also characteristic are pheasants, pittas, Old World babblers, and flowerpeckers.

Indomalaya has 1000 species of amphibians in 81 genera, about 17 of global species. 800 Indomalayan species, or 80%, are endemic. Indomalaya has three endemic families of amphibians, Nasikabatrachidae, Ichthyophiidae, and Uraeotyphlidae. 329, or 33%, of Indomalayan amphibians are considered threatened or extinct, with habitat loss as the principal cause.

More information is available under Indomalayan realm fauna.

Indomalayan ecoregions

See also 
 Ecoregions of India
 Ecoregions of the Philippines
 Mainland Southeast Asia (the Indochinese Peninsula)
 Malesia
 Sundaland

Bibliography
 Wikramanayake, E., E. Dinerstein, C. J. Loucks, D. M. Olson, J. Morrison, J. L. Lamoreux, M. McKnight, and P. Hedao. 2002. Terrestrial ecoregions of the Indo-Pacific: a conservation assessment. Island Press, Washington, DC, USA, .

References

 
Biogeographic realms
Biogeography
.
Environment of Asia

Natural history of Asia
Phytogeography